Arsaciodes is a monotypic moth genus of the family Noctuidae. Its only species, Arsaciodes rufa, is found in Costa Rica. Both the genus and the species were first described by Schaus in 1912.

References

Catocalinae
Monotypic moth genera